Kent Road station was a commuter rail stop on the Danbury Branch of the Metro-North Railroad's New Haven Line. It was located near the border between Wilton and Norwalk, south of a grade crossing with Kent Road in Wilton, Connecticut. It opened in 1976 and closed in 1994. A previous station on the site, South Wilton, closed in 1971.

History

Original station

The original station located at the site was located on the north side of Kent Road and was originally called Kent. Kent was opened in 1852 by the Danbury and Norwalk Railroad. The name of the station was changed to South Wilton when the railroad was leased by the Housatonic Railroad in 1886, possibly to distinguish it from the HRR's already existing station in the town of Kent. The station served the nearby Kensett Sanitarium, Which burned down in 1912. The station was also known as Hopkins. Which is possibly a reference to Fred Hopkins, who was the station agent at the Wilton station for many years. 

The station was closed by Penn Central on February 1, 1971. The station was demolished not long afterwards.

Replacement station
The station was replaced on January 12, 1976, when a new station called Kent Road was opened on the south side of Kent Road by Penn Central to serve Perkin-Elmer's headquarters in Wilton. However, ridership at the station gradually decreased over time and by 1985, the station served just a dozen daily riders.
Metro-North discontinued service at Kent Road on January 16, 1994. ConnDOT director of rail operations Dick Rathburn cited the station's lack of parking, poor geographic location, dwindling ridership, and potential obsoleteness with the newly renovated Merritt 7 station located just 1 mile south. Rathburn even claimed that the station "Was only put up as a temporary measure to provide transportation for Perkin-Elmer employees." The station consisted of a low-level side platform and a small shelter, which are no longer extant.

References

External links
Google Street View of former site of Kent Road Station
Google Street View of former site of South Wilton Station

Metro-North Railroad stations in Connecticut
Buildings and structures in Wilton, Connecticut
Stations along New York, New Haven and Hartford Railroad lines
Railway stations in the United States opened in 1852
Railway stations closed in 1971
Railway stations in the United States opened in 1976
Railway stations closed in 1994
Railroad stations in Fairfield County, Connecticut
1852 establishments in Connecticut
1971 disestablishments in Connecticut
1976 establishments in Connecticut
1994 disestablishments in Connecticut
Former railway stations in Connecticut